The Curragh Racecourse is a flat racecourse in County Kildare, Ireland. The racecourse is home to Ireland’s five most important flat races, known as the Classics. Racing takes place 23 days each year from the end of March until late October. Guided tours of the venue are available outside of race days.

History 

The name "Curragh" comes from the Irish language word Cuirreach, meaning "place of the running horse". The first recorded race on the plain took place in 1727, but it was used for races before then. The first Derby was held in 1866, and in 1868 the Curragh was officially declared a horse racing and training facility by act of parliament.

Racecourse redevelopment 

Redevelopment of the Curragh grandstand and racecourse facilities began in 2017 with completion due in time for commencement of the 2019 Irish Flat season. A truncated racing fixture list continued to be held at the course during this period with temporary facilities in place for the public.

Racing 

The Curragh is a right-handed track, horseshoe and galloping in nature with a testing uphill finish. The track spans two miles in distance with a one-mile chute. It is home to all five Irish Flat Classics.

Training grounds 
The Curragh training grounds provide trainers with the opportunity to prepare their horses on approximately 1,500 acres of training facilities. In addition to 70 miles of turf gallops, there are approximately 12 miles of peat gallops and eight all-weather tracks available to work on. The Curragh refurbished and resurfaced all of the all-weather gallops between 2020 and 2021. The Old Vic woodchip gallop over 9-furlongs on the Curragh is Ireland’s most popular all-weather gallop and a proven test of a racehorse.

Previous champion horses 
Numerous elite level racehorses have run at the course prior to becoming multiple Group One winners around the world. Due to the fair nature of the track, the course has a reputation for attracting high quality two-year old runners in particular, with many making their first racecourse appearances at the Curragh.

Notable races

Transport

Bus and coach 
On race days, there are free shuttle buses from Kildare railway station and the town square and from Newbridge town railway station and Main Street to The Curragh. Expressway operates services from Dublin City centre to the racecourse on major race days.

Former railway stations 
The racecourse was once served by two railway stations: Curragh Mainline on the main Dublin–Cork line, which opened in 1846, and Curragh Racecourse at the end of a short branch to the grandstand, which opened in 1875. Curragh Racecourse station closed in 1977 and the branch was subsequently lifted, while Curragh Mainline fell into disuse in the early 2000s.

References

External links 

 Curragh.ie – Official site
 Pattern race calendar can on Horse Racing Ireland's site

 
Horse racing venues in the Republic of Ireland
Sports venues in County Kildare
Tourist attractions in County Kildare
Sports venues completed in 1727